Ambla is a small borough in Järva County, in Järva Parish, in central Estonia. It was the administrative centre of Ambla Parish. As of 2011 Census, the settlement's population was 299.

Gallery

See also
Ambla River

References

External links
Ambla Parish 

Boroughs and small boroughs in Estonia
Kreis Jerwen